is a six-part anime OVA produced by Sunrise and released in 1988. It is based on the 1959 book Starship Troopers by Robert A. Heinlein. The OVA was dedicated to Heinlein, who died before the first part of the series was released.

Mecha design
Kazutaka Miyatake of Studio Nue originally designed the mobile infantry powered armors in the OVA for a Japanese edition of the novel (published by Hayakawa Publishing, Japan's largest science fiction publisher) in the early eighties. A mecha based on this design also appears on the DAICON III and IV Opening Animations from 1981 and 1983, a few years before the OVA was released.

Episode list
 "Johnny"
 "Hendrick"
 "Maria"
 "Greg"
 "Cherenkov"
 "Carmencita"

References

External links
 
 Starship Troopers at Gears Online
 
 Armored Fighting Suit (Archived)
 Armored Fighting Suit Cont.. (Archived)

1988 anime OVAs
Mecha anime and manga
Starship Troopers television series
Sunrise (company)
Anime film and television articles using incorrect naming style
Anime based on novels